The Happy Valley Reservoir is a water reservoir located in the southern Adelaide suburb of Happy Valley, South Australia. Constructed when the total population of Adelaide numbered 315,200 (1893 census), the Happy Valley Reservoir now supplies over half a million people, from Adelaide's southern extent to the city centre. The surrounding area is home to much wildlife, including many kangaroos.

Construction
Built between 1892 and 1897 at a cost of A$1.8 million it was the third reservoir constructed in South Australia as a supplement to the Thorndon Park Reservoir (built 1860) and the Hope Valley Reservoir (built 1872).

The original Happy Valley township, school and cemetery were completely flooded by the new reservoir requiring their relocation. The township was moved to the east while the cemetery, which is still in use today, was moved to the west and relocated alongside the base of the dam wall. The school, originally located on Candy road, was relocated south to two acres of land on Red Hill Road (later renamed Education road) which was donated by local farmer Harry Mason. While some students attended O'Halloran Hill or Clarendon schools for the 18 months that the Happy Valley school was closed, some did not attend any school until it was re-opened on 26 September 1898. The school closed in December 1979 and re-opened on a new site on the other side of the road directly opposite.

The reservoir acts as a 'holding pond' for water directed to it from the Clarendon Weir via a five km long tunnel. The 1.8 m diameter tunnel was bored simultaneously from both ends and when meeting had a deviation of 25 mm. Its deepest point underground is 122 m where it passes through a hill. On 7 August 1896 the tunnel's inlet valve was opened by the Governor of South Australia, Sir Thomas Fowell Buxton and the reservoir began filling.

Continuing use
Initially 15 kilometres from Adelaide, the reservoir is now largely enveloped by the city's southern suburbs, of which the relocated Happy Valley village is now one. Although the reservoir is relatively small in capacity; holding only 11,500 megalitres and is dwarfed by Mount Bold Reservoir which is at least four times larger, it is the site of the biggest water treatment plant in Adelaide and is responsible for providing more than 40% of the city's water.

The natural "bush" of the reservoir's enclosed catchments are home to kangaroos, echidnas and koalas. Several areas have also been planted with managed pine plantations to reduce soil erosion and provide an income from harvesting. As a result of the plantations being located within what are now inner city suburbs they have become almost iconic. In the early 2000s, plans to harvest the mature pines were blocked following public protests over the visual impact the clearance and replanting would have on the surrounding suburbs.

Water from the dam was originally supplied to Adelaide through a tunnel under Black Road. In the early 1960s, the original intake tunnel from the Clarendon Weir was increased in size to allow access by maintenance vehicles, and a second outlet tunnel was constructed under South Road. In 1986 this new tunnel became the sole outlet for the reservoir when the original outlet was abandoned. At the same time the Thorndon Park Reservoir was decommissioned and reestablished as a recreational park.

Upgrades
Between 2002 and 2004, the reservoir underwent a major renovation as part of A$22 million rehabilitation project aimed at enhancing the Reservoir to meet guidelines of best practice for dam management at both international and national levels. The reservoir's earth wall was particularly susceptible to piping failure (a small leak, called a pipe, gets larger until the dam collapses) and the renovations lowered the risk of dam wall failure from 1 in 1,200 to an estimated 1 in 100,000.  Part of this project included an upgrade of the dam wall designed to also increase flood storage capacity by 165% and reduce the risk of damage in the event of an earthquake.

With the lowering of the water level during renovations exposing the original Happy Valley township for the first time, archaeologists took the opportunity to excavate the site. Despite the township being entirely intact and undamaged when flooded in 1896, very little was found apart from scattered bricks and the foundations of several buildings, of which only the post office was identified.
Capacity: 11.5 Gigalitres
Length of wall: 1,155 m
Height of wall: 23.6 m
Type of wall: Earth with clay core
Area of water spread:  

In 2020, a further major renovation occurred, when the majority of the remaining pine plantations were cleared to allow the construction of a 13MW ground-mounted solar panel array, designed to supply the water treatment facility entirely with green energy, reducing operating costs.

Recreational use
The reservoir was opened to the public on 11 December 2021 for the first time in more than 120 years, after a network of trails and other facilities were built by the state government.  It is part of the Glenthorne Precinct, along with Marino Conservation Park, areas of the Field River valley, Hallett Cove Conservation Park and the Glenthorne National Park–Ityamaiitpinna Yarta, which was opened in 2020.

See also
List of reservoirs and dams in Australia

References

1897 establishments in Australia
Reservoirs in South Australia
Dams in South Australia
South Australian Heritage Register